Şirinbəyli (formerly Tverskoye, Oktyabrabad) is a village and municipality in the Saatly Rayon of Azerbaijan.  It has a population of 4,056.

References 

Populated places in Saatly District